Mats Kettilmundsson (also Mattias) (ca. 1280 - died 11 May 1326) was a Swedish knight, riksdrots and statesman.

Biography
In 1302, Mats Kettilmundsson was one of the knights and confidants of Duke Eric Magnusson (c. 1282–1318). 
He presided on the Swedish regency council alongside   Queen Ingeborg (1301–1361) and her sister-in-law Ingeborg Eriksdottir (1297-1357)  in a joint regency for the minor King Magnus IV of Sweden (1316-1374). 
During 1319, Mats Kettilmundsson  resigned  but continued to occupy a significant place among the council  and as the king's guardian.

In 1322 he participated in the meeting  of nobles   at Skara.
During his later years,  he was a courtier in Finland. As commander of the military in Swedish Finland, but against the wishes of the Swedish government, in 1325 he crossed the Gulf of Finland and attacked Tallinn (then a Danish possession), alleging that the city must be punished for executing four of his soldiers who had gone on a rampage there. He died in May 1326  probably at Turku.

References
 

Year of birth missing
14th-century deaths
Swedish politicians
14th-century Swedish people